Ahmad Mahmud Gunle is a Somalian politician from Puntland who served as Vice President of Puntland.

References 

Somalian politicians
Living people
Year of birth missing (living people)

Vice presidents of Puntland